Sardar Khan is a Pakistani politician who had been a member of the Provincial Assembly of Khyber Pakhtunkhwa from October 2018 till January 2023.

Political career
Khan was elected to the Provincial Assembly of Khyber Pakhtunkhwa from the constituency PK-3 in 2018 Pakistani by-elections on the ticket of Pakistan Muslim League (N)

References

Living people
Pakistan Muslim League (N) politicians
Politicians from Khyber Pakhtunkhwa
Year of birth missing (living people)